Tidmarsh with Sulham is a combined parish council area in the English county of Berkshire. It covers the civil parishes of Tidmarsh and Sulham, including the hamlets of Maidenhatch and Nunhide. The parish council's area shares boundaries with the adjoining parishes of Pangbourne, Purley on Thames, Tilehurst, Theale, Englefield and Bradfield, with the M4 motorway forming part of the southern boundary of the area.

References

External links
Tidmarsh-with-Sulham Website

Local government in Berkshire
West Berkshire District